Melibe viridis is a species of sea slug, a nudibranch, a marine gastropod mollusk in the family Tethydidae.

Distribution
This species occurs in the Mediterranean Sea, the Red Sea, the Andaman Sea off Phuket, off Mozambique and off Indonesia.

Description

The body reaches a length of 140 mm. Like some other nudibranch species, M. viridis has an oral veil that it uses to trap prey.

References

 MacNae, W. & M. Kalk (eds) (1958). A natural history of Inhaca Island, Mozambique. Witwatersrand Univ. Press, Johannesburg. I-iv, 163 pp.
 Gosliner T.M. (1987) Review of the nudibranch genus Melibe (Opisthobranchia: Dendronotacea) with descriptions of two new species. The Veliger 29(4): 400–414
 Gofas, S.; Le Renard, J.; Bouchet, P. (2001). Mollusca, in: Costello, M.J. et al. (Ed.) (2001). European register of marine species: a check-list of the marine species in Europe and a bibliography of guides to their identification. Collection Patrimoines Naturels, 50: pp. 180–213 
 Streftaris, N.; Zenetos, A.; Papathanassiou, E. (2005). Globalisation in marine ecosystems: the story of non-indigenous marine species across European seas. Oceanogr. Mar. Biol. Annu. Rev. 43: 419–453 
 Gosliner T.M. & Smith V.G. (2003) Systematic review and phylogenetic analysis of the nudibranch genus Melibe (Opisthobranchia: Dendronotacea) with descriptions of three new species. Proceedings of the California Academy of Sciences 54: 302–356.
 Gosliner T.M., Behrens D.W. & Valdés A. (2008) Indo-Pacific nudibranchs and sea slugs. Sea Challengers Natural History Books and California Academy of Sciences. 426 pp.

External links 
 
 http://www.seaslugforum.net/find/meliviri
 http://www.seaslugforum.net/factsheet/melijapo
 
 
 Ben G Thomas (Feb 8, 2021) Melibe viridis - Animal of the Week Youtube video 5:31

Tethydidae
Gastropods described in 1858